Kai Bracht (born 27 April 1978) is a retired German ski jumper.

In the World Cup he finished three times among the top 30, his best result being a 25th place from Tauplitz in March 2003.

External links

1978 births
Living people
German male ski jumpers
People from Eberbach (Baden)
Sportspeople from Karlsruhe (region)